Archbishop of Tirana may refere to:

 Eastern Orthodox Archbishop of Tirana-Durrës, head of the Albanian Orthodox Church
 Roman Catholic Archbishop of Tirana-Durrës, senior Catholic prelate in Albania

See also
 Archdiocese of Tirana (disambiguation)